The London and North Eastern Railway (LNER) Thompson Class B1 is a class of steam locomotive designed by Edward Thompson for medium mixed traffic work.

Overview 
It was the LNER's equivalent to the highly successful GWR Hall Class and the LMS Stanier Black Five, two-cylinder mixed traffic 4-6-0s. However, it had the additional requirement of having to be cheap because, due to wartime and post-war economies, the LNER, never the richest railway company, had to make savings.

Introduced in 1942, the first example, No. 8301, was named Springbok in honour of a visit by Jan Smuts.  The first 40 of the class were named after breeds of antelopes and the like, and they became known as bongos after 8306 Bongo. 274 were built by the LNER. 136 were built by British Railways after nationalisation in 1948.  The total number in stock at any one time however was only 409 as 61057 was involved in an accident in 1950 and was scrapped.

The prototype for the new B class (later classified B1) 4-6-0 was built at Darlington and entered service on 12 December 1942. It was the first 2-cylinder main-line locomotive constructed for the LNER since the grouping, such had been Sir Nigel Gresley's faith in the 3 cylinder layout. With cost saving a wartime priority the LNER's draughtsmen went to great lengths to re-use existing patterns, jigs and tools to economise on materials and labour. Extensive use was made of welding instead of steel castings.

The appearance of No. 8301 (subsequently renumbered No. 1000) coincided with a visit to Britain by the Prime Minister of South Africa, Field Marshal Jan Smuts, and, as mentioned above, it was named Springbok. 18 other B1s took the names of LNER directors. Not that there were many B1s to be named during the war years: constraints on production meant that the first ten were not completed until 1944. However, Thompson then placed substantial orders with two outside builders: Vulcan Foundry and the North British Locomotive Company of Glasgow. Between April 1946 and April 1952 NBL built 290 B1s. Over the period the cost of each engine rose from £14,893 to £16,190. Vulcan Foundry contributed 50 at £15,300 apiece. Orders for the B1s, which became Nos. 61000–61409 under British Railways, totalled 410.

The B1s operated throughout LNER territory. The first batch was distributed among depots on the former Great Eastern Railway section: Ipswich, Norwich, and Stratford in London. They were an immediate success and were soon working the Liverpool Street - Harwich boat trains, the Hook Continental, the Day Continental and the Scandinavian. B1s were also a familiar sight on other top-link workings such as The East Anglian, The Broadsman and The Fenman. During the 1950s over 70 B1s were stationed on ex-GE lines.

They enjoyed similar popularity on ex-Great Northern and Great Central territory. Engines based at Darnall, Sheffield were regularly rostered for the Master Cutler and South Yorkshireman expresses. Elsewhere there were substantial allocations in Scotland, West Yorkshire and East Yorkshire.

If any fault is to be highlighted on the B1, it must be the ride quality. O. S. Nock often criticised the B1s for a poor ride, not something many were used to on the Gresley engines. The B1 was very cheap to build, but the final result was an engine that was somewhat lacking in the quality LNER men had come to expect. The two-cylinder layout gave the engines good starting power and excellent hill climbing abilities, but it also caused very bad hunting effects, a result of the use of cut-offs of up to 75% (a 10% advance on Gresley engines), and as such they were less kind on the passengers they carried than the B17s they replaced.

Overall, however, it was entirely necessary that the B1s be introduced, because the LNER was operating a large number of engines that were well past their economic life. It was somewhat ironic that among the engines that came under threat with the arrival of the B1s were the ones that Thompson admired the most: the engines of the North Eastern Railway designed by Vincent Raven (his father-in-law).

Operation
B1s could be found over almost all of the LNER network, and that of the BR Eastern and North Eastern Regions.

The last scheduled steam-hauled passenger train to arrive in Liverpool Street was the up Day Continental on 9th September 1962 hauled by a B1 61156.

Accidents and incidents 
The locomotive was badly damaged; after being moved to Stratford Works, it and its tender were withdrawn and later scrapped.

Names 

59 of the 410 locomotives were named.  Early B1s were named after species of antelope, whilst later engines were named after members of the board of directors of the LNER. This led to the fact that the Class B1 contained the shortest name given to a British locomotive ((6)1018 Gnu) and one of the longest ((6)1221 Sir Alexander Erskine-Hill).

Note this does not include all engines

Withdrawal 

With the change in the policies of British Railways, the B1s were withdrawn long before their projected economic working life.  Excepting No. 61057 which was destroyed in an accident in 1950, the first normal withdrawal was No. 61085 in November 1961. The remaining locomotives were withdrawn between 1962 and 1967.

Departmental service 

After withdrawal from capital stock, 17 were taken into departmental stock where they were used as boilers for carriage heating.  For this they had their couplers removed so they could not haul trains, though they could still propel themselves.

Preservation 
Two have been preserved, these being 61264 and 61306.  Both of these were built by North British Locomotive Company. No. 61264 has the distinction of being the only LNER locomotive to be sent and later rescued from Barry Scrapyard.

Note: Loco numbers in bold mean their current number.

(* denotes historically inauthentic)

Preservation photos

References

Citations

References
 
 
  (2004 reprint )

External links 

 LNER encyclopedia
 Thompson B1 Locomotive Trust (owners of (6)1264)
 1306 Mayflower (owners of (6)1306)

4-6-0 locomotives
B01
NBL locomotives
Vulcan Foundry locomotives
Railway locomotives introduced in 1942
Standard gauge steam locomotives of Great Britain
2′C h2 locomotives